Mansfeld-Südharz is a district in Saxony-Anhalt, Germany.

History 

The district was established by merging the former districts of Sangerhausen and Mansfelder Land as part of the reform of 2007. In the German parliament, the Bundestag, the area forms part of the Mansfeld electoral district.

Towns and municipalities 

The district Mansfeld-Südharz consists of the following subdivisions:

References